Sergio Roitman and Andrés Schneiter were the defending champions but did not compete that year.

Paul Haarhuis and Sjeng Schalken won in the final 6–4, 6–2 against Àlex Corretja and Luis Lobo.

Seeds

  Paul Haarhuis /  Sjeng Schalken (champions)
  Mariano Hood /  Sebastián Prieto (first round)
  Jack Waite /  Jason Weir-Smith (first round)
  Gastón Etlis /  Martín Rodríguez (semifinals)

Draw

External links
 2001 Energis Open Doubles Draw

Dutch Open (tennis)
2001 ATP Tour
2001 Dutch Open (tennis)